The Men's individual table tennis – Class 10 tournament at the 2012 Summer Paralympics in London took place from 30 August to 2 September 2012 at ExCeL Exhibition Centre. Classes 6–10 were for athletes with a physical impairment who competed from a standing position; the lower the number, the greater the impact the impairment was on an athlete’s ability to compete.

In the preliminary stage, athletes competed in four groups of three. Winners of each group qualified for the semi-finals, together with four seeded players given byes for the preliminary round.

Results
All times are local (BST/UTC+1)

Finals

Preliminary round

Group A

30 August, 16:00

31 August, 12:20

31 August, 20:00

Group B

30 August, 16:00

31 August, 12:20

31 August, 20:00

Group C

30 August, 16:00

31 August, 12:20

31 August, 20:00

Group D

30 August, 16:00

31 August, 12:20

31 August, 20:00

References

MI10